The discography of The Dillinger Escape Plan, an American mathcore band, consists of six studio albums, six extended plays (EPs), two split EPs, eight singles, one video album, 15 music videos and seven other appearances. Formed in Morris Plains, New Jersey in 1997, the band originally featured vocalist Dimitri Minakakis, guitarists Ben Weinman and Derek Brantley, bassist Adam Doll and drummer Chris Pennie; Brantley left after two shows and was replaced briefly by touring guitarist John Fulton, who himself left in 1998. In 1997 the band released its self-titled debut EP on New Jersey independent label Now or Never Records, after which they were signed by Relapse Records who issued their second EP Under the Running Board in 1998. The EP charted on the UK Singles Chart, reaching number 194.

Following the addition of Brian Benoit to replace Fulton, The Dillinger Escape Plan released its debut full-length album Calculating Infinity in 1999. Jeff Wood played bass on the album's promotional tour, and was later replaced the following year by Liam Wilson. In 2001, Minakakis left the band and was not replaced for a number of months, during which time the remaining members performed a string of instrumental shows and recorded a number of tracks with vocalist Mike Patton of Faith No More and Mr. Bungle. The material was later issued in 2002 as the Irony Is a Dead Scene EP, which reached the top 20 of the US Billboard Independent Albums chart. Patton also performed on the band's recording of "Damaged, Parts I & II" for the Black Flag tribute album Black on Black: A Tribute to Black Flag.

Greg Puciato was enlisted as the replacement for Minakakis in late 2001. He made his recording debut for the band on 2004's Miss Machine, which charted for the first time on the US Billboard 200 when it reached number 106. Benoit left the band in April 2005 due to a nerve injury, and was replaced by James Love. Love was later replaced by Jeff Tuttle. Pennie also left in 2007, with Gil Sharone replacing him. Later in the year, the band released its third studio album Ire Works, which reached the top 150 of the album charts in the US and the UK. In early 2009, Billy Rymer replaced Sharone as the band's drummer. 2010's Option Paralysis, the band's first album to be released on their own label Party Smasher, reached number 78 on the Billboard 200 and number 107 on the UK Albums Chart.

In 2012, Tuttle left the band to attend film school. The band released its fifth album One of Us Is the Killer the following year, with the album charting in the US at number 25, in the UK at number 64, and in several other regions for the first time in the group's career. Love returned to the band in 2013, although was not featured on One of Us Is the Killer. After a brief hiatus during which Weinman focused on Giraffe Tongue Orchestra and Puciato on Killer Be Killed and The Black Queen, Love was replaced by Kevin Antreassian in 2015. The band released Dissociation in 2016, which was presented as the group's final album before embarking on an indefinite hiatus the following year. The album reached number 31 on the Billboard 200, number 47 on the UK Albums Chart, and number 80 on the Canadian Albums Chart.

Albums

Studio albums

Live albums

Extended plays

Studio EPs

Split EPs

Live EPs

Singles

Video albums

Music videos

Other appearances

References

External links
The Dillinger Escape Plan official website

Heavy metal group discographies
Discographies of American artists